The M1 motorway is a toll motorway in northwestern Hungary, connecting Budapest to Győr and Vienna. The first section of the motorway opened in the 1970s, reaching the Austrian border at Hegyeshalom in 1996. It follows the route of the old Route 1 one-lane highway.

Openings timeline
Budapest – Budaörs (7 and 12 km): 1964 - half profile; (this section was extended 2x3 lane in 1978-79)
Budaörs – Budakeszi (4 km): 1981 - half profile; (this section was extended in 1986)
Budakeszi – Zsámbék (9 km): 1986
Zsámbék – Bicske (13 km): 1985
Bicske – Tatabánya-north (28 km): 1982
Tatabánya-north – Komárom (20 km): 1975 - half profile; (this section was extended 2x2 lane in 1990)
Komárom – Győr-east (19 km): 1977 - half profile; (this section was extended 2x2 lane in 1990)
Győr-east – Győr-Ménfőcsanak (8 km): 1994
Győr-Ménfőcsanak – Győr-west (14 km): 1994
Győr-west – Hegyeshalom-east (42 km): 1996
Hegyeshalom-east – Border station of Austria   (6 km): 1982 - half profile; this section operated as part of road 1 until 1996

List of junctions, exits and rest area

Distance from Zero Kilometre Stone (Adam Clark Square) in Budapest in kilometres. 

 The route is full length motorway.

Maintenance
The operation and maintenance of the road by Hungarian Public Road Nonprofit Pte Ltd Co. This activity is provided by these highway engineers.
 near Bicske, kilometre trench 38
 near Komárom, kilometre trench 85
 near Lébény, kilometre trench 142

Payment
Hungarian system has 2 main type in terms of salary:

1, time-based fee vignettes (E-matrica); with a validity of either 10 days (3500 HUF), 1 month (4780 HUF) or 1 year (42980 HUF).

2, county vignettes (Megyei matrica); the highway can be used instead of the national sticker with the following county stickers:

{| class="wikitable"
|- 
!Type of county vignette !! Available section
|-
|Pest County
| between Egér Street junction and Bicske (7 km – 39 km)
|-
|Fejér County
| between Herceghalom and Tatabánya-Óváros (27 km – 56 km)
|-
|Komárom-Esztergom County
| between Bicske and Győrszentiván (39 km – 112 km)
|-
|Győr-Moson-Sopron County
| between Bábolna and Hegyeshalom [state border] (94 km – 172 km)
|}

Toll-free section
From Border of Budapest to Egér Street section (5 km – 7 km) can be used free of charge.

European Route(s)

See also 

 Roads in Hungary
 Transport in Hungary
 International E-road network

References

External links 

National Toll Payment Services Plc. (in Hungarian, some information also in English)
 Hungarian Public Road Non-Profit Ltd. (Magyar Közút Nonprofit Zrt.)
 National Infrastructure Developer Ltd.

1